is a Japanese manga series written and illustrated by Koyoharu Gotouge. It was serialized in Shueisha's shōnen manga magazine Weekly Shōnen Jump from February 2016 to May 2020, with its chapters collected in 23 tankōbon volumes. It has been published in English by Viz Media and simultaneously published by Shueisha on their Manga Plus platform. It follows teenage Tanjiro Kamado, who strives to become a Demon Slayer after his family was slaughtered and his younger sister, Nezuko, turned into a demon.

A 26-episode anime television series adaptation produced by Ufotable aired from April to September 2019. A sequel film, Demon Slayer: Kimetsu no Yaiba – The Movie: Mugen Train, was released in October 2020 and became the highest-grossing anime film and Japanese film of all time. An 18-episode second season of the anime series aired from October 2021 to February 2022. It featured one original episode, re-edited the Mugen Train film into six episodes, and then covered the "Entertainment District" arc from the manga in 11 episodes. A compilation film, Demon Slayer: Kimetsu no Yaiba – To the Swordsmith Village, was released in February 2023 while a third season covering the "Swordsmith Village" arc is set to premiere in April 2023.

By February 2021, the manga had over 150 million copies in circulation, including digital versions, making it the ninth best-selling manga series of all time. Also, it was the best-selling manga in 2019 and 2020. Both the manga and its anime adaptation have received critical acclaim. The anime series has received numerous awards and is considered one of the best anime of the 2010s.

Synopsis

Setting
The story takes place in Taishō era Japan, where a secret society, known as the Demon Slayer Corps, has been waging a secret war against demons for centuries. The demons are former humans who were turned into demons by Muzan Kibutsuji injecting them with his own blood, and they feed on humans and possess supernatural abilities such as super strength, powers that demons can obtain called "Blood Demon Art", and regeneration. Demons can only be killed if they are decapitated with weapons crafted from an alloy known as Nichirin, injected with poison extracted from wisteria flowers, or exposed to sunlight. The Demon Slayers, on the other hand, are entirely human; however, they employ special elemental breathing techniques, known as "Breathing Styles", which grant them superhuman strength and increased resistance, helping them fight against demons. The strongest Demon Slayers are known as the Hashira, and gain this rank through either killing a member of the Twelve Kizuki (the twelve strongest demons under Muzan) or killing fifty demons after ranking up multiple times.

Plot

Tanjiro Kamado is a kind-hearted and intelligent boy who lives with his family in the mountains. He became his family's breadwinner after his father's death, making trips to the nearby village to sell charcoal. Everything changed when he came home one day to discover that his family was attacked and slaughtered by a demon. Tanjiro and his sister Nezuko were the sole survivors of the incident, with Nezuko being transformed into a demon, but still surprisingly showing signs of human emotion and thought. After an encounter with Giyū Tomioka, the Water Hashira of the Demon Slayer Corps, Tanjiro is recruited by Giyū and sent to his retired master Sakonji Urokodaki for training to also become a Demon Slayer, beginning his quest to help his sister turn into a human again and avenge the death of his family.

After two years of strenuous training, Tanjiro takes part in a formidable exam and is one of the few survivors to pass, officially making him a member of the Demon Slayer Corps. He begins his work of hunting down and slaying demons alongside Nezuko, who has been hypnotized to bring no harm to humans and who occasionally helps him in battle. One of Tanjiro's assignments brings him to Asakusa where he encounters Muzan Kibutsuji, the progenitor of all demons and the one who murdered his family. He also meets Tamayo and Yushiro, demons who are free from Muzan's control. Tamayo and Yushiro ally with Tanjiro and begin to develop a cure for Nezuko, though it will require Tanjiro to supply Tamayo with blood from the Twelve Kizuki, the most powerful demons under Muzan's command.

Continuing his missions, Tanjiro meets Zenitsu Agatsuma and Inosuke Hashibira, fellow survivors of the exam with whom he forms an unlikely team during a battle with the former Lower Rank Six of the Kizuki. The group soon faces off against Lower Rank Five of the Kizuki, and although Tanjiro unlocks a mysterious style called "Hinokami Kagura", they are ultimately outmatched; they are rescued by Giyū and Insect Hashira Shinobu Kocho and brought back to headquarters. There, the Kamado siblings partake in a council between Kagaya Ubuyashiki, the leader of the Demon Slayer Corps, and the Hashira, the Corps' most elite members, who (with the exception of Giyū) do not believe that Nezuko should be allowed to live. However, Kagaya nonetheless manages to convince them to accept her. With this agreement, Tanjiro begins to work alongside the Hashira, where he encounters significantly more resistance from the demons. Alongside the Hashira and Corps members, Tanjiro takes part in numerous harrowing battles against the Kizuki, which they survive by narrow margins while also taking losses of their own, including the death of Flame Hashira Kyojuro Rengoku and retirement of Sound Hashira Tengen Uzui. During a battle in the Swordsmith Village, Tanjiro meets Genya Shinazugawa, the younger brother of Wind Hashira Sanemi Shinazugawa, who has the mysterious ability to temporarily become a demon by eating demon flesh. It is also discovered that Nezuko is invulnerable to sunlight, a discovery that makes her the prime target of Muzan, who has long sought a way to overcome the sun and thus become the ultimate being. Tanjiro also learns that his Hinokami Kagura is descended from Sun Breathing, the original breathing style invented by Yoriichi Tsugikuni, the strongest Demon Slayer in history, and develops it to prepare to fight Muzan.

Kagaya forecasts Muzan's intentions and enacts a strict training regiment of the entire Corps to prepare for the upcoming battle. With the blood samples obtained from the Kizuki, Tamayo develops a serum to cure Nezuko, who is kept isolated far from the battle as she recovers. Muzan soon appears before Kagaya, who triggers a suicide attack to stagger him. The Hashira and Tanjiro ambush Muzan, but he traps them all within Infinity Castle, an endless labyrinth that houses the remaining Kizuki. Tamayo restrains Muzan with a poison she concocted, leaving him vulnerable to attack. To reach him, the Corps defeat the remaining Kizuki members, though Shinobu, Genya, and Mist Hashira Muichiro Tokito are killed. Muzan kills Tamayo by crushing and absorbing her but is forced above ground by the Corps. A desperate battle of attrition ensues as the remainder of the Demon Slayer Corps fight against Muzan until the morning sun can kill him. Aided by Tamayo's poison, the Corps succeed, though they take huge losses, including Stone Hashira Gyomei Himejima, Serpent Hashira Obanai Iguro, and Love Hashira Mitsuri Kanroji, with Giyu, Tengen, and Sanemi as the only Hashira survivors, while Tanjiro is mortally wounded while delivering the final blow. Helpless against the sun, Muzan forcefully gives his remaining blood to a dying Tanjiro and transforms him into the ultimate demon in a last-ditch effort to have his species survive. Tanjiro begins to attack the remaining Corps members, but through the efforts of his allies and Nezuko, who has been fully restored to her human self, he is turned back into a human.

In the aftermath of the battle, the Corps is disbanded as the death of Muzan has effectively vanquished all other demons (except for Yushiro, who leaves to live a peaceful life as a painter). Tanjiro and Nezuko return to their family home, accompanied by Zenitsu and Inosuke. Tanjiro marries fellow Demon Slayer Kanao Tsuyuri while Nezuko marries Zenitsu. In a modern-day epilogue, the descendants and reincarnations of the Corps members enjoy a peaceful life free of demons.

Production
After Gotouge's manga, Haeniwa no Zigzag, published in Weekly Shōnen Jump in 2015, failed to become a serialized work, Tatsuhiko Katayama, Gotouge's first editor, suggested Gotouge to start a series with an "easy-to-understand theme". Gotouge's debut work Kagarigari would become the basis for an initial draft, titled  since it had concepts like swords and demons, which would be familiar to the Japanese audience. However, due to its serious tone, lack of comic relief, and dark story, this draft was not accepted for serialization, so Katayama asked Gotouge to try writing a brighter, more normal character in the same setting. Although it is a made-up word,  seemed easy to understand, so Gotouge thought it would be interesting to abbreviate the series' title that way; the word  implies a Japanese sword. According to Gotouge, the series' three biggest influences are JoJo's Bizarre Adventure, Naruto and Bleach. Tatsuhiko Katayama, an editor of the Demon Slayer manga, has said in interviews that the red-haired, scar-faced Tanjiro was inspired by Rurouni Kenshin, a 1990s manga about a similarly drawn swordsman, Himura Kenshin.

Media

Manga

Written and illustrated by Koyoharu Gotouge, Demon Slayer: Kimetsu no Yaiba was serialized in Shueisha's shōnen manga magazine Weekly Shōnen Jump from February 15, 2016, to May 18, 2020.<ref name="2newseries"></p></ref><ref></p></ref> Shueisha collected its chapters in twenty-three individual tankōbon volumes, released from June 3, 2016, to December 4, 2020.

Shueisha simultaneously published the series in English on the Manga Plus service starting January 2019. Viz Media published the first three chapters in its digital magazine Weekly Shonen Jump as part of the "Jump Start" program. During their panel at San Diego Comic-Con on July 20, 2017, Viz announced that they had licensed the manga for the North American market. The first volume was released on July 3, 2018.

Spin-offs
, a two-chapter manga spin-off, was published in Shueisha's Weekly Shōnen Jump on April 1 and 8, 2019. Gotouge is credited with the original work and Ryōji Hirano drew the manga. The manga follows the character Giyū Tomioka. A side-story for the manga was published in the first issue of Shōnen Jump GIGA on July 20, 2016.

, a colored 4-koma spin-off by Ryōji Hirano, was serialized between April 7 and September 29, 2019, on Shueisha's Shonen Jump+ app and website. The manga featured chibi versions of the characters from the main series.

In May 2020, after the main series finished, a spin-off titled , illustrated by Ryōji Hirano and centered on Kyojuro Rengoku was announced to be released. The two chapters of Rengoku Gaiden were published in Weekly Shōnen Jump on October 12 and 17, 2020. A collected gaiden tankōbon volume, which includes Giyu Tomioka Gaiden, Kyojuro Rengoku Gaiden, and Kimetsu no Aima!, was released on December 4, 2020. Viz Media released the volume, under the title Demon Slayer: Kimetsu no Yaiba--Stories of Water and Flame, on January 4, 2022.

A 19-page special one-shot chapter written and illustrated by Gotouge, centered on Rengoku's first mission, was published in Weekly Shōnen Jump on October 5, 2020. An 84-page booklet, titled Rengoku Volume 0, which includes the 19-page one-shot chapter and interviews with the staff and cast of the film, was given to the Demon Slayer: Kimetsu no Yaiba the Movie: Mugen Train theatergoers on October 16, 2020. The booklet had a limited print run of 4.5 million copies.

A spin-off manga series, titled , related to the Kimetsu Gakuen Valentine-hen anime shorts, started in Shueisha's Saikyō Jump magazine on August 4, 2021. Shueisha released the first volume on January 4, 2022. As of July 4, 2022, two volumes have been released.

Light novels
A light novel, titled , by Gotouge and Aya Yajima, was published in Japan on February 4, 2019. It chronicles the lives of Tanjiro and Zenitsu before the start of the main series, as well as glimpses into the lives of Aoi and Kanao. It also features a single chapter of an alternate universe where the characters attend an ordinary high school. A second light novel, titled , by Gotouge and Yajima, was published in Japan on October 4, 2019. It details the lives of Shinobu and Kanae Kocho before and soon after they joined the Demon Slayers after Himejima Gyomei saved their lives. A third light novel, titled , centered on Sanemi Shinazugawa, was published on July 3, 2020. In February 2022, Viz Media announced that they would publish the three light novels in 2022.

Other print media
A fanbook, was released on July 4, 2019. It features background information on several characters from the series. It also includes the complete three chapters of the initial draft of the series, titled .

A second fanbook, was released on February 4, 2021. It also includes the one-shot  which was published in Jump GIGA 2018 WINTER Vol.3 in 2018.

An art book, titled , was released on February 4, 2021.

Anime

An anime television series adaptation by studio Ufotable was announced by Weekly Shōnen Jump in June 2018. The anime was directed by Haruo Sotozaki and produced by Hikaru Kondo. Akira Matsushima served as the character designer. The series ran for 26 episodes, broadcast from April 6 to September 28, 2019, on Tokyo MX, GTV, GYT, BS11, and other channels.

The second season ran for two consecutive cours; beginning with a television series adaptation of the "Mugen Train" story arc on October 10, 2021. It included an original first episode, as well as new animation cuts and background music that differ from the film adaptation. , has been announced to premiere on December 5, 2021, with a one-hour special. The main staff and cast members from the first season returned to reprise their roles. The series was broadcast on 30 stations and channels, including Fuji TV and Tokyo MX, covering most of Japan.

At the end of the second-season finale, a third season covering the "Swordsmith Village" arc from the manga has been announced. It is set to premiere on April 9, 2023, with a one-hour special.

In North America, the series is licensed by Aniplex of America. It was released on two limited editions Blu-ray volumes: the first on June 30, 2020, and the second on November 24, 2020. The company also partnered with Funimation to release standard-edition Blu-ray volumes. Two volumes were released on September 29, 2020, and January 19, 2021. The series has been streamed on Crunchyroll, Hulu, and FunimationNow. Netflix also started streaming the series starting January 22, 2021 in the United States. An English dub produced by Aniplex of America and Bang Zoom! Entertainment premiered on Adult Swim's Toonami programming block on October 13, 2019. According to Jason DeMarco, Adult Swim executive producer who oversees the block, the success of the Mugen Train film made the series too expensive to license for broadcast.

Funimation began streaming the English dub on December 8, 2020. Madman Entertainment acquired the series in Australia and New Zealand and simultaneously streamed the series on AnimeLab. In the United Kingdom and Ireland, Anime Limited acquired the series.

Funimation streams Demon Slayer: Kimetsu no Yaiba – Entertainment District Arc. Muse Communication licensed the second season in Southeast Asia and South Asia; they streamed it on iQIYI, Bilibili, WeTV, Viu, Netflix, and Disney+.

Four Valentine's Day-themed anime shorts, titled , debuted on the Aniplex YouTube channel on February 14, 2021.

Compilation films

Prior to airing, the first five episodes screened theatrically in Japan for two weeks from March 29, 2019, under the title . Aniplex of America screened the film at the Aratani Theatre in Los Angeles on March 31, 2019. Madman Entertainment screened the film in select theatres in Australia on April 2, 2019. Fuji TV also rebroadcast the series in the Kanto area, under the title : episodes 6–10 aired from October 12–16, episodes 11–14 on October 17, and episodes 22–26 on October 24, 2020. Episodes 22–26 were recompiled into a special edition episode, titled , which adds some new footage and special ending credits roll, and aired on Fuji TV on December 20, 2020.

A compilation film, which includes the 10th and 11th episodes of Entertainment District Arc and an advanced screening of the first Swordsmith Village Arc episode, premiered in Japan on February 3, 2023. The film premiered in the United Kingdom on March 1, 2023, and in North America on March 3 of the same year.

Film

On September 28, 2019, immediately following the airing of episode 26, an anime film titled; Demon Slayer: Kimetsu no Yaiba the Movie: Mugen Train was announced, with the staff and cast reprising their roles. The film is a direct sequel to the anime series and covers the events of the "Mugen Train" story arc. The film is distributed in Japan by Aniplex and Toho and premiered in Japan on October 16, 2020.

The film has grossed over  worldwide, making it the highest-grossing film of 2020, and broke several box office records, including the highest-grossing Japanese film and anime film of all time. The film was released worldwide digitally on June 22, 2021.

Music
Yuki Kajiura and Go Shiina composed the anime's music. LiSA performed the opening theme , while the ending theme is "from the edge" by FictionJunction and LiSA. For the second season's Mugen Train Arc, LiSA performed the opening theme , as well as the ending theme . For the Entertainment District Arc, Aimer performed the opening theme , as well as the ending theme . For the third season's Swordsmith Village Arc, Man with a Mission and milet will perform the opening theme .

Soundtracks of the Demon Slayer: Kimetsu no Yaiba anime were accompanied with the Blu-ray and DVD volume releases of the anime. A soundtrack album for first season of the anime series, titled , published by Aniplex, was released on May 26, 2021. A second soundtrack album containing 50 tracks used in the film and Mugen Train Arc titled,  was released on December 14, 2022. The soundtrack albums include the opening and ending themes as well as the instrumental score by Kajiura and Shiina.

Video games

A mobile game titled  was announced to be released in 2020 by publisher Aniplex with development by Aniplex subsidiary Quatro A. In December 2020, it was announced that the game's release was delayed indefinitely to improve its quality.

A video game based on the series was announced in 2020. Titled , it is developed by CyberConnect2, and published by Aniplex. The game was released for PlayStation 4, PlayStation 5, Xbox One, Xbox Series X and Series S and Steam on October 14, 2021, in Japan. Sega published the game worldwide for the same platforms on October 15, 2021.

Stage plays
A stage play adaptation of the manga was announced by Weekly Shōnen Jump in September 2019. The stage play was performed from January 18–26 in Tokyo at the Tennōzu Ginga Gekijō and from January 31 to February 2, 2020, in Hyōgo Prefecture at the AiiA 2.5 Theater Kobe. Kenichi Suemitsu scripted and directed the play and Shunsuke Wada composed the music. The cast includes Ryota Kobayashi as the protagonist Tanjirō Kamado, Akari Takaishi as his sister Nezuko, Keisuke Ueda as Zenitsu Agatsuma, Yūgo Satō as Inosuke Hashibira, Reo Honda as Giyū Tomioka, Tomoyuki Takagi as Sakonji Urokodaki, Mimi Maihane as Tamayo, Hisanori Satō as Yushirō, and Yoshihide Sasaki as Muzan Kibutsuji.

A second stage play adaptation was announced at the Jump Festa '21 event in December 2020, with the cast and staff returning. The Demon Slayer: Kimetsu no Yaiba the 2nd: Bonds stage play ran in Tokyo from August 7–15, in Osaka from August 20–22, and then again in Tokyo from August 27–31, 2021. A traditional Noh-Kyōgen stage play was announced at the Jump Festa '22 in December 2021. It ran from July 26–31 at the Kanze Noh Theater in Tokyo and from December 9–11, 2022 at the Ohtsuki Noh Theater in Osaka. The cast includes Ohtsuki Yuichi as Tanjiro Kamado and his younger sister Nezuko, Ohtsuki Bunzo as Rui, and Nomura Mansai, who is also a stage director, played the main antagonist Muzan Kibutsuji.

A third stage play adaptation was announced by Weekly Shōnen Jump in January 2022. The Demon Slayer: Kimetsu no Yaiba The Stage Part 3: Mugen Dream Train stage play is performed on September 10 and 11 at the Tokyo Dome City Hall in Tokyo, at Kyoto Theater in Kyoto from September 16–25, and again at the Tokyo Dome City Hall from October 15–23, 2022.

Art exhibition
An art exhibition of the series ran in Tokyo's Mori Arts Center Gallery from October 26 to December 12, 2021. The exhibition displayed numerous artworks drawn by Koyoharu Gotouge and also sold original goods. The exhibition ran in the Grand Front Osaka from July 14 to September 4, 2022.

Reception

Popularity and cultural impact
In January 2021, it was reported that Japanese sales of print books and magazines fell 1% in 2020 compared to the previous year, being the smallest per-year decline since 2006. This small decline was attributed to an increase in reading in Japan due to the COVID-19 pandemic and the "successful boom" of the Demon Slayer: Kimetsu no Yaiba manga and its related publications. According to CharaBiz, a database for character licensing business in Japan, Demon Slayer: Kimetsu no Yaiba is the highest-grossing franchise of 2020, surpassing other well-known franchises such as Anpanman, Pokémon, Mickey Mouse and Peanuts (Snoopy). Entertainment District Arc averaged 18.43 million viewers, with 25.5 million for episode 10 and 25.97 million for episode 11.

Gadget Tsūshin listed both the breathing techniques suffix and "Ah! The era, the era changed again!" on their 2019 anime buzzwords list. In 2019, Demon Slayer: Kimetsu no Yaiba won in the anime category of the Yahoo! Japan Search Awards, based on the number of searches for a particular term compared to the year before; the series won the award for the second consecutive year in 2020, and was third in 2021. On Tumblr's 2020 Year in Review, which highlights the largest communities, fandoms, and trends on the platform throughout the year, Demon Slayer: Kimetsu no Yaiba ranked seventh on the Top Anime & Manga Shows category. According to a 2020 poll conducted by education and publishing company Benesse, which asked 7,661 third to sixth-grade Japanese children (5,170 girls and 2,491 boys), Tanjiro Kamado ranked 1st on the top 10 most admired people, which placed the children's mothers, fathers, and teachers on second, fourth and fifth place, respectively, with the remaining spots occupied by other Demon Slayer: Kimetsu no Yaiba characters. According to a 2020 internet poll conducted by Oricon Monitor Research, over 90% of the Japanese public is familiar with Demon Slayer: Kimetsu no Yaiba; 40.5% said that they were "very familiar", 57.3% said that they were "familiar with the name", indicating that 97.8% knew the existence of the series. Of the 1,558 respondents who said that they were "very familiar", 1,182 respondents "like" or "very liked" the series. To the question of "what part of the series do you like?", the series' story was the most popular aspect with 76.4% votes, followed by the setting with 49.3% and the relatability of the characters with 45.3% votes. 31% of the fans said that they owned the manga, and of the 66.1% of those fans said they owned every volume. According to multiple respondents, the series helped them treasure and connect with their families and allowed people of different generations to connect even in the workplace and beyond. The poll was responded from November 18–24 by 3,848 members of Oricon Monitor Research, ranging from people in their teens to their sixties. The series helped to increase internal tourism, with many tourists traveling to similar spots to the ones featured in the series. In 2021, in Tokushima, the Red Cross featured characters from the series on blood drive posters, which helped to increase the number of donors. The series has been featured in Japanese high school textbooks starting in 2022.

Regarding the series' sudden huge success, Weekly Shōnen Jump editor-in-chief Hiroyuki Nakano stated that the manga sales shot up straight after its anime adaptation finished, explaining that a large number of people watched the series through streaming services after it ended rather than watching it weekly. Nakano also stated that currently, it is harder for a manga series running in the magazine to become a hit, and Demon Slayer: Kimetsu no Yaiba despite having started in February 2016, did not become a major hit until late 2019, adding that its success "hinged on word of mouth generated after the anime's run". Nakano have also said it introduced many new people and audience into Jump. According to Yuma Takahashi, Demon Slayer: Kimetsu no Yaiba anime series producer, the series had three main factors for its success: "The power of the original work, the attitude towards adapting it to anime, and the environment". Takahashi explained that although many people learned about the manga through the anime, that in itself is not enough to generate a hit, stating that the original manga itself is interesting and they tried to adapt it earnestly without losing any of its appeal. The earnest attitude towards the adaptation and techniques from the staff at Ufotable were other key factors. Takahashi pointed out the changes in the anime-viewing landscape within the past few years and the increasing popularity of the streaming platforms. Takahashi said that by airing the series for two cours, it had the time to build up an audience. Takahashi added: "While the anime was airing, the story being serialized in the manga was heating up, so the timing was also ideal. It wasn't as if it suddenly became the center of attention; I feel that it steadily picked up fans and expanded its audience". On December 20, 2020, at the Jump Festa '21, Mayumi Tanaka, voice actress of One Pieces Monkey D. Luffy, read aloud a message from One Piece creator Eiichiro Oda, in which he praised Gotouge's series, and wrote: "At Jump, Demon Slayer was really amazing. I enjoyed how it was able to save the feelings of so many people. Absolutely superb work. This is how I want manga to be. It touched me, somehow!". Yusuke Murata said that the series' contribution to the industry as a whole is immeasurable, while Gege Akutami commented that the series created many new manga fans.

In January 2021, Gundam franchise's creator Yoshiyuki Tomino discussed his thoughts on the series in an interview, where he said that he initially felt jealous of how the series attracted "such a dedicated and talented staff", and said: "The voice actors are great, the composer of the song that everyone knows is great. So many talented people showed up! In that sense, what I felt surpassed envy, and I started thinking, 'Man, those guys sure are something!'". Nevertheless, Tomino called the series cultural success a coincidence, explaining: "I don't think that Demon Slayer is a calculated or contrived work. I think that its assemblage was quite a coincidence", adding that in the anime industry people often get chosen for a job because they "just happened to be there" or their schedules "happened to align at the right time" and that it is rare for people with exactly the ideal talents or innate qualities to get chosen.

Former prime minister of Japan Yoshihide Suga quoted the series at a House of Representatives Budget Committee in the National Diet in November 2020. Some politicians in Japan used patterns and logos from the series in their campaigns in 2021. Current prime minister of Japan, Fumio Kishida, said that he had read all the volumes of the series, commenting as well that he would improve the conditions of the anime and manga industry.

Manga
The series ranked 14th on the "Nationwide Bookstore Employees' Recommended Comics of 2017" poll by Honya Club online bookstore. On Takarajimasha's Kono Manga ga Sugoi! ranking of top 20 manga for male readers, the series ranked 19th on the 2018 list, sixth on the 2019 list, and 17th on the 2020 list. On Rakuten Kobo 2020 First Half Ranking, the series was first in every demographic group, from male and female teenagers to older adults. In 2020, Gotouge received the 2nd Kodansha's Noma Publishing Culture Award, which honors those who have contributed to "reinventing publishing". Gotouge received the award due to the franchise's sales, which have boosted the entire publishing industry from 2019 to 2020. It ranked 16th, along with Chainsaw Man, on "The Best Manga 2021 Kono Manga wo Yome!" ranking by Freestyle magazine. On TV Asahi's Manga Sōsenkyo 2021 poll, in which 150.000 people voted for their top 100 manga series, Demon Slayer: Kimetsu no Yaiba ranked second, only behind One Piece.

Manga artists have lauded the series; Yoshihiro Togashi wrote a praising comment featured on the obi of series 4th volume; Osamu Akimoto wrote a praising comment featured on the obi of the series' fifth volume; Takayuki Yamaguchi praised the series and recommended it in a 2018 interview, around the time of its tenth volume. Author Kinoko Nasu called it one of his favorite new manga works. Comedian and novelist Naoki Matayoshi also praised the series.

Sales
Demon Slayer: Kimetsu no Yaiba is one of the best-selling manga series of all time. By February 2019, the series had 3.5 million copies in circulation worldwide; over 10 million copies in circulation by September 2019; over 25 million copies in circulation by December 2019; and over 40 million copies in circulation by February 2020. By the end of February 2020, it was revealed that the franchise has sold 40.3 million copies, making it the fifth best-selling manga in Oricon's history. On May 6, 2020, the franchise recorded over 60 million copies in circulation (including digital copies). On May 22, 2020, it was revealed that the series has sold 60.027 million physical print copies, making it the third series in Oricon's history to sell over 60 million physical print copies. In July 2020, the franchise recorded over 80 million copies in circulation, including 71 million physical print copies sold. With the release of volume 22 on October 2, 2020, the franchise recorded 100 million copies in circulation, including 90.518 million physical print copies sold, making it as well the ninth series from Weekly Shōnen Jump to reach 100 million copies in circulation, after KochiKame, Fist of the North Star, Dragon Ball, JoJo's Bizarre Adventure, Slam Dunk, One Piece, Naruto and Bleach. In December 2020, the series recorded over 120 million copies in circulation (including digital copies), including 102.892 million copies sold, making Demon Slayer: Kimetsu no Yaiba the second manga series to sell over 100 million copies in Oricon's records after One Piece, which achieved this feat in 2012. In February 2021, the manga recorded over 150 million copies in circulation (including digital copies).

In February 2020, the 19th volume sold an estimated 1.378 million copies in its first week, making Demon Slayer: Kimetsu no Yaiba the third manga series to have a single print volume sell more than 1 million copies in its first week, after One Piece (45 times) and Attack on Titan (2 times). In May 2020, the regular and limited editions of the 20th volume sold a total of 1,990,249 physical print copies. In July 2020, the regular and limited editions of volume 21 sold a total of 2,041,177 physical print copies. In October 2020, volume 22 ranked first in Oricon's manga sales chart for four consecutive weeks, with 326,000 physical print copies sold. In December 2020, the 23rd and final volume sold 2.855 million copies in its first week, the most that any manga volume has sold in one week in Oricon's history. In January 2021, it was reported that volumes 8, 1, and 7 of the series sold cumulative totals of 5.03 million, 5.029 million, and 5.009 million copies, respectively, being the first manga volumes to sell over 5 million copies in Oricon's history. The 23rd and final volume is the first manga volume to sell over 4 million copies in Oricon's half-year sales ranking charts since Oricon began posting rankings in 2008. By May 2021, nineteen volumes in the series had each sold over 5 million copies. The Stories of Water and Flame volume is Shueisha's first spin-off volume with an initial print run of 1 million copies.

In November 2019, Shueisha stated that Demon Slayer: Kimetsu no Yaiba was their second best-selling manga 2019, with 10.8 million volumes sold, second only to Eiichiro Oda's One Piece, with 12.7 million volumes sold in the same period. Nevertheless, the series ranked first in 2019 Oricon's annual manga ranking chart, with over 12 million copies sold, while One Piece ranked at second, with over 10.1 million copies sold, making Demon Slayer: Kimetsu no Yaiba the best-selling manga of 2019. Oda wrote a message regarding Gotouge's manga achievement.

Demon Slayer: Kimetsu no Yaiba was the first series to take all top 10 positions of Oricon's weekly manga chart. The manga occupied the entire top 10 for a full month, and it was also the first series in Oricon's history to occupy the entire top 19 weekly rank. In October 2020, the twenty-two volumes, at the time, of the series occupied the top 22 spots of Oricon's weekly manga chart. It was the best-selling manga for the first half of 2020, with 45,297,633 copies sold, and its twenty volumes (including a special edition of volume 20) at the time, were among the top 25 best-selling manga volumes of 2020. Demon Slayer: Kimetsu no Yaibas first twenty-two volumes were the best-selling manga volumes of 2020, making the series as well the best-selling manga series in 2020, with 82,345,447 copies sold.

In North America, the volumes of Demon Slayer: Kimetsu no Yaiba were ranked on NPD BookScan's monthly top 20 adult graphic novels list since September 2019. They were also ranked on The New York Times monthly Graphic Books and Manga bestseller list since February 2020. It was the best-selling manga series in the first half of 2021, with over 26 million copies sold, while four of its volumes (volumes 18, 19, 22, and 23), Stories of Water and Flame, and the first fanbook were among the 25 best-selling manga volumes. It was the second best-selling manga in 2021 with over 29.5 million copies sold, while volume 23 and Stories of Water and Flame were the first and second, respectively, best-selling manga volumes. The second fanbook and four other manga volumes were among the top 30 best-selling volumes.

According to ICv2, Demon Slayer: Kimetsu no Yaiba was the best-selling manga franchise for fall 2021 (September–December) in the United States, and it was also the second "most efficient manga franchise" for retailer bookshelves, based on the website's calculations of which manga franchises had the highest sales per volume. According to NPD BookScan, four volumes of Demon Slayer: Kimetsu no Yaiba were ranked among the top 20 highest-selling manga volumes in 2021. By May 2021, the Viz Media edition had over 4 million copies in circulation.

Critical reception
Before its anime series adaptation, Nicholas Dupree of Anime News Network included the series on his list of "The Most Underrated Shonen Jump Manga", and wrote: "Kimetsu is still arguably an oddity in Jump, but it's firmly established its style that's certainly worth looking out for." Rebecca Silverman of the same website ranked the first volume as a B−. Silverman praised the plot ideas and characters but had issues with its pacing. She labeled Gotouge's art as "unpolished and inconsistent," although she commended details such as those in Tanjiro and Nezuko's clothing which illustrate both the poverty and loving environment from where they come. Silverman concluded that it is the work of a promising author and had positive expectations for the series' development.

Leroy Douresseaux of Comic Book Bin gave the first volume a score of 9/10. He commended the series for its "ability to convey power in simplicity," explaining that Gotouge's art is "nice" but overly detailed, and the dialogue and exposition are straightforward. Douresseaux praised its characters and recommended the series to fans of demon-fighting heroes. Nick Smith of ICv2 gave the first volume a score of 4/5. He wrote that the story is well crafted and the characters intriguing, but the setting is "too deadly for the survival of the human race." Smith said that the artwork is good but not special and recommended the series to "teens and adults who like heroes fighting back against horrific evil." Che Gilson of Otaku USA praised the series for its plot, action and character development. Gilson said that the art is "stiff", but that instead of looking like rough drawings or traced photo composites, the series "looks as if it were carved and printed from woodblocks." Gilson concluded: "With an engrossing plot and characters, Volume 1 builds to a cliffhanger that makes it hard to wait for the next volume." Chris Beveridge of The Fandom Post criticized the first chapter for being "overly wordy when just the action would suffice," and ultimately called it "a work-in-progress series." After having watched the anime adaptation, Melina Dargis of the same website was so fascinated by the story and characters that she decided to go back and review the second volume of the manga. Despite knowing what would happen, Dargis wrote that it was "still such a delight to relive it again" and concluded; "It's a really great story and appeals to a wide variety of interests."

Nobuyuki Izumi of Real Sound compared the series' premise, setting, and structure to Hirohiko Araki's JoJo's Bizarre Adventures first two parts, Phantom Blood and Battle Tendency, and to Kazuhiro Fujita's Ushio & Tora.

Accolades

Light novels and other print books
In 2019, Demon Slayer: Flower of Happiness had about 210,966 copies sold, and Demon Slayer: One-Winged Butterfly had about 196,674 copies sold. Both novels ranked third and fourth respectively in Oricon's overall bunko ranking chart. Demon Slayer: Kimetsu no Yaiba overall novelization was the tenth best-selling light novel in 2019, with 407,640 copies sold. In February 2020, after a planned reprint collectively 1.16 million copies were in circulation, making the books the fastest franchise novel in Shueisha's "Jump J-Books" label to reach 1 million copies in circulation. The two light novels were the best-selling novels of the first half of 2020, collectively selling a total of 1,199,863 copies. The Demon Slayer: Kimetsu no Yaiba overall novelization was the best-selling light novel of 2020, with 2,752,593 copies sold. The Demon Slayer: Kimetsu no Yaiba overall novelization was the best-selling novel series in the first half of 2021, collectively selling a total of 651,358 copies, while the three novels and the Demon Slayer: Kimetsu no Yaiba the Movie: Mugen Train novelization (and its "Mirai bunko" edition), were among the best-selling-novel volumes in the first half of 2021. The three light novels were among the top 5 best-selling light novel volumes of 2021, while the overall novelization was the best-selling light novel, with 776,320 copies sold.

Four other books were among the best-selling general books of 2021: the art book, Demon Slayer: Kimetsu no Yaiba – Koyoharu Gotouge Artbook: Ikuseisо, was third with 491,007 copies sold; Demon Slayer: Kimetsu no Yaiba – Coloring Book: Blue was seventh, with 414,523 copies sold; Demon Slayer: Kimetsu no Yaiba – Coloring Book: Red was ninth with 370,460 copies sold; and the anime's third official characters book was thirteenth, with 278,531 copies sold. Due to sales of the novels and the other books, Gotouge was second on the general book ranking chart of 2021, with over 1.4 million copies sold. In May 2020, Demon Slayer: Flower of Happiness ranked tenth in a favorite children's book poll conducted by the Children's Book Election Office, among over 250,000 elementary school children.

Anime

Critical reception
Writing for Monsters and Critics, Patrick Frye wrote that the anime adaptation is "praised [for] the animation quality and flowing battle scenes that integrate digital effects seamlessly" while noting that "some fans have complained about weird story pacing issues thanks to flashbacks and some slow moments, but everyone agrees that once the action picks up, it's amazing." Writing for Anime News Network, James Beckett highlighted Episode 19 by noting it was "a thrilling showstopper of an episode, showing off ufotable's considerable skills as producers of nearly unrivaled action spectacle."

The anime series has been considered as one of the best anime of the 2010s. Polygon'''s Austen Goslin wrote that "Few shows over the last 10 years have so clearly or unabashedly made fights their focus, and absolutely none of them have done it as well as Demon Slayer". Crunchyroll listed it in their "Top 25 best anime of the 2010s", with reviewer Daniel Dockery commenting, "From the top-notch action choreography to the understated (and sometimes not so understated) emotional moments, to the infinitely meme-able Inosuke, Demon Slayer can be a wonder to behold". Writing for Comic Book Resources, Sage Ashford ranked it second on his list, praising its animation and protagonists, whom he called "the most likable male and female leads of the decade". IGN also listed Demon Slayer: Kimetsu no Yaiba among the best anime series of the 2010s. Japan Web Magazine ranked the series 1st on its list of "30 Best Anime of All Time".

Accolades
In the February 2020 issue of Animedia magazine, it was revealed that the series received eleven awards for its characters at the "Animedia Character Awards 2019". Having won the most awards in a single year in animedia history. In a poll conducted by Kadokawa Game Linkage of the most satisfying series of 2019, Demon Slayer: Kimetsu no Yaiba'' ranked in the first place, and it was also reported that between its debut episode and last episode the viewership numbers increased by 1.4 million. In April 2020, the anime series won the Grand Prix award and the New Face Award at the Japan Character Award by Japan's Character Brand Licensing Association (CBLA). In 2020, the series became one of five recipients of the Special Achievement Award at the 62nd Japan Record Awards.

Explanatory notes

References

External links
  
  at Shonenjump.com 
  at Viz.com
  at Demonslayer-anime.com
 

2019 anime television series debuts
 
Adventure anime and manga
Anime and manga about revenge
Anime composed by Yuki Kajiura
Anime series based on manga
Aniplex
Cannibalism in fiction
Crunchyroll Anime Awards winners
Dark fantasy anime and manga
Demons in anime and manga
Fiction set in the 1910s
Funimation
Historical fantasy anime and manga
Japanese mythology in anime and manga
Jump J-Books
Martial arts anime and manga
Muse Communication
Shōnen manga
Shueisha franchises
Shueisha manga
Taishō period in fiction
Toonami
Ufotable
Upcoming anime television series
Viz Media manga
Yōkai in anime and manga